Khirbat Bayt Lid was a Palestinian Arab village in the Tulkarm Subdistrict. It was depopulated by its Arab inhabitants during the 1948 Arab–Israeli War.

History
500 meters north of Khirbat Bayt Lid was El Mughair, which was described in 1882 by  PEF's Survey of Western Palestine as "a small mud hamlet, with caves. The water supply is from springs a mile to the west."

Originally, the people of Khirbat Beit Lid came from Beit Lid to farm the lower plain village land. Gradually they settled in the village so they could be closer to their land.

British Mandate era
In the 1922 census of Palestine conducted by the British Mandate authorities,  Kherbet Bait Lid had a population of 206  Muslims, increasing in  the 1931 census to 298 Muslim, in a total of 75 houses.

In  the 1945 statistics the population of Khirbat Bayt Lid was 460 Muslims with a total of  5,336 dunams of land, of which 2,969 were owned by Arabs, 2,220 by Jews and 147 was public lands. 

Of this, Arabs used 64 dunams for irrigated and plantation land, 2,877 for cereals, while 22 dunams were classified as built-up areas.

1948, aftermath
In early 1948  the villagers grew fearful over news about fighting, and left for  Beit Lid, where they had relatives, believing that they would return in some weeks. According to one villager, Husni 'Abd al-Latif 'Atawat; "They left all their belongings in Khirbat Bayt Lid. The Jews occupied it, and they could not return."

The  Moshav Nordia was established on village land in August 1948, while  Ganot Hadar is situated 500 meter northeast of the village site, but not on village land.
Benny Morris writes that  HaYogev is close to the Khirbat Bayt Lid site.

References

Bibliography

External links
Welcome To Bayt Lid, Khirbat
 Khirbat Bayt Lid,  Zochrot
Survey of Western Palestine, Map 10:    IAA, Wikimedia commons
Bayt Lid, Khirbat, from Khalil Sakakini Cultural Center

Arab villages depopulated during the 1948 Arab–Israeli War
District of Tulkarm